The Valencia International Piano Competition Prize Iturbi (also referred to as the José Iturbi International Piano Competition) is an international piano competition held in Valencia, Spain. It is named after virtuoso José Iturbi, born in Valencia. Created in 1981, it has been held ever since in the month of September and is part of the World Federation of International Music Competitions.

After four annual editions, in 1986 it became a biennial competition. In 2004 Valencia's Palau de la Música replaced the city's Teatro Principal as the competition's headquarters. In 2013 the competition was changed to a triennial periodicity. The competition consists of five rounds, as shown in the chart below. The prize has always included a cash award, recital and orchestral engagements, and a recording contract. As of 2013, the winner is awarded €18,000 in cash. On two occasions, 1982 and 1992, a First Prize was not awarded.

The Valencia Orchestra takes part in the finals.

Winners

References

External links
Official website

José Iturbi International Piano Competition
Music competitions in Spain